Sara Jenkins (née Barber; 25 January 1941 – 22 October 2020) was a Canadian swimmer. She competed at the 1956 Summer Olympics and the 1960 Summer Olympics. She died of complications of Alzheimer's disease in 2020.

References

External links
 

1941 births
2020 deaths
Canadian female swimmers
Olympic swimmers of Canada
Swimmers at the 1956 Summer Olympics
Swimmers at the 1960 Summer Olympics
Swimmers at the 1959 Pan American Games
Sportspeople from Brantford
Pan American Games silver medalists for Canada
Pan American Games medalists in swimming
Swimmers at the 1954 British Empire and Commonwealth Games
Swimmers at the 1958 British Empire and Commonwealth Games
Swimmers at the 1962 British Empire and Commonwealth Games
Commonwealth Games medallists in swimming
Commonwealth Games silver medallists for Canada
Commonwealth Games bronze medallists for Canada
Medalists at the 1959 Pan American Games
Deaths from Alzheimer's disease
20th-century Canadian women
21st-century Canadian women
Medallists at the 1958 British Empire and Commonwealth Games
Medallists at the 1962 British Empire and Commonwealth Games